The Rauhhügel is an 812.9 m high (above sea level) mountain located in the Thuringian Highland, Thuringia (Germany).

It is located close to the municipalities of Schmiedefeld and Lichte and the Leibis-Lichte Dam in the  Saalfeld-Rudolstadt district in the Thuringian Forest Nature Park within walking distance of the Rennsteig.

The Leipzig tower on top of the Rauhhügel is 17.5 m high. It has viewing platforms on two levels, the upper at 14 m, from which in good weather one can see far into the surrounding mountains of the Thuringian Highland, the Thuringian Forest and to mountains of the Fichtelgebirge and the Erzgebirge, including:

 Neuhaus am Rennweg (830 m)
 Ochsenkopf, (1.024 m) Fichtelgebirge
 Schneekopf, (1.051 m) Fichtelgebirge
 Fichtelberg, (1.214 m) Erzgebirge

There is a guesthouse at the base of the tower.

References

See also
 List of Mountains and Elevations of Thuringia

Mountains of Thuringia
Thuringian Forest
Lichte